The Civil Police of Rio de Janeiro State (Polícia Civil do Estado do Rio de Janeiro, in Portuguese) is the police force responsible for criminal investigations in Rio de Janeiro, Brazil.  Formed in 1808, it is subordinated to the state government and directed by a Chief of Police, chosen by the state's Governor.

Roles and functions today

The police activity of prevention and repression of the penal infractions is exercised by the Police Stations situated in the police circumscriptions which correspond to the geographic areas of the suburbs of Rio Metropolitan Region or the country municipalities.

Each Police Station is directed by a Police Delegate helped by Adjunctive Police Delegates, chiefs of police groups and police services.

According to their geographic localization in the territory of the State, the Police Stations are subordinate to one of the three great operational departments  of the Police: of the Capital (Rio de Janeiro city), of the "Baixada Fluminense" (municipalities which form Rio de Janeiro Metropolitan Area, except Rio de Janeiro city) and Inland (which contains ten regions).

The criminal investigations developed by the police stations may be supported by the Specialized Police Department, through its specialized organs (divisions) when repressing the homicide crimes of unknown authors, narcotics, robbery, theft and large frauds.

Special Operations
The CORE (Coordenadoria de Recursos Especiais, in Portuguese), formed in 1969, is a police tactical unit within the Civil Police of Rio de Janeiro.

It is a special service which use highly trained policemen in dangerous tasks that police have to face daily.

Guns 
 Minimi MK2 (Used by Core)
 Madsen Machinegun
 Heckler & Koch PSG1 Sniper rifle     (Used by CORE)
 Armalite SuperSASS Sniper Rifle (Used by CORE)
 AK-47 rifle (Used by specialized department)
 FN FAL rifle
 Heckler & Koch G3 rifle (Used by CORE)
 M16 rifle        (Used by CORE)
 IMBEL MD97 rifle (Used by specialized department)
 IMBEL MD rifle
 AR-15 carbine
 CAR-15 carbine 
 M16A2 
 M16A2 Commando (Used by CORE) 
 Ruger Mini-14 carbine (Used by specialized department)
 CT30 Carbine
 Heckler & Koch MP5 submachine      (Used by CORE)
 Taurus PT940 pistol
 Taurus PT92 pistol
 Taurus PT 24/7 pistol
 Taurus Millennium series pistol
 Glock pistol       (Used by CORE)

Career

 Police Delegate (Delegado)
 Police Crime Register Agent (Oficial de Cartório Policial)
 Police Inspector (Inspetor de Polícia)
 Police Investigator (Investigador Policial)
 Criminal Expert (Perito Criminal)

Gallery

In popular media
The Rio civil police appear in Fast Five, the fifth movie of the Fast and the Furious series, where many of them are corrupt and in the payroll of drug lord Hernan Reyes, being sent to try and retrieve his vault full of his drug money after it was stolen from the Military Police of Rio de Janeiro State (PMERJ) station alongside the PMERJ and Federal Highway Police (PRF). However, thanks to Dominic Toretto and his team, all of their pursuing cruisers are destroyed, their corrupt officers slaughtered, and Reyes himself executed by DSS Agent Luke Hobbs in revenge for murdering his team back in the favelas. Their primary police cruisers used in the film are mostly 6th and 7th generation models of the Dodge Charger, but some use the 1st generation of the Ford Focus sedan.

See also

 Civil Police (Brazil)
 CORE (special operations)
 Civil Police Museum (Rio de Janeiro)
 Brazilian Federal Police
 Brazilian Intelligence Agency
 Civil Police of the Federal District

References

External links
 Official website 
 November operations  
 Civil Police in Alemão restraint - 2010
 CORE - Special operations 

Rio de Janeiro
Government agencies established in 1808
1808 establishments in Brazil
Government of Rio de Janeiro (state)